Remotely Funny is a British children's game show hosted by Sara Forsberg. The show is produced by Twenty Twenty Kids for CBBC. The show features three children from across the United Kingdom connected remotely via webcam competing in various challenges to win points known as 'Samojis'. The series began on 13 February 2017.

Format
In each episode, there are three contestants (except for the Sibling Special) who take part in games, activities and quizzes to win points known as 'Samojis'. Host Sara Forsberg can also give out 'Samojis' for doing something funny or any other reason. The winner wins a Remotely Funny jumper. The runners up win Remotely Funny merchandise, like a memory stick or highlighter. From Series 2 however, the runners up get a ruskeakastike cap.

Rounds
Between rounds, Forsberg will also ask a contestant a question about their family.

"Bedroom Bonanza": Forsberg will read out a description of an item like 'something you would never want to give away' and the contestants must race to find something matching that description in their bedroom. The first person back wins 3 of her 'priceless' Samojis. She may also give Samojis to people that chose something good, so if the description was 'something you would bring on a desert island' and someone brought a water bottle, they would get an extra Samoji.
"Toilet Takedown": In the first part, Forsberg will read a trivia question like 'How many toilets does Wembley Stadium have?'. The contestant must writer their answer on toilet paper, the contestant with the closest answer wins. In the second part, Forsberg will show the contestants a video on LooTube (a wordplay on YouTube) and ask a question asking what they think is going to happen next. The first person that flushes the toilet gets to answer.
"Food Flash": Forsberg shows the contestant a picture of a Finnish food dish, then the contestants must then make the food dish they saw. The winner is the contestant's dish is closest to the actual dish. The contestants must also use ruskeakastike, a Finnish gravy and one of Forsberg's favourite foods. They can also win a bonus Samoji if they get their parents to try it.
"Kitchen Lol-lympics": Introduced in Series 2. The contestants must compete in certain tasks, inside the kitchen, to win certain Samojis.
"Meet the Family (Remotely Funny Families)": The contestant's parents must finish the lyrics to a famous song or use pedometers and get the most steps while dancing. These are then looped repeatedly.
"The Decider (Say What You See Moji):" Forsberg shows the contestants a set of 'see mojis', representing a catchphrase, a movie or something else. The contestants must work out what they represent. Then Forsberg reveals the winner.

Transmissions

Episodes

Series 1 (2017)

Series 2 (2018)

References

External links

2017 British television series debuts
2018 British television series endings
2010s British children's television series
BBC children's television shows
English-language television shows
BBC high definition shows
BBC television game shows
2010s British game shows
British children's game shows
Television series about children